Roger Ryberg (born 16 April 1952 in Kirkenes) is a Norwegian politician for the Labour Party. He has held the position as county mayor of Viken since 2020. He previously served as county mayor of Buskerud from 2007 to 2011 and again from 2015 to 2019. 

Following the 2007 election, Ryberg became the new county mayor (fylkesordfører) of Buskerud. Behind him was a coalition of the Labour Party, the Socialist Left Party, the Centre Party and the Liberal Party, who kept the right-wing candidate Mette Lund Stake at bay with 22 versus 21 votes in the county council. Before being elected county mayor, Ryberg had been mayor of Hurum municipality. He also served as a deputy representative to the Parliament of Norway from Buskerud during the term 1989–1993.

Following the 2019 Norwegian local election, he was elected as the county mayor of the newly established Viken county.

In April 2022, Ryberg announced that he wouldn't be seeking re-election in the 2023 local elections.

He resides at Filtvet.

References

1952 births
Living people
Labour Party (Norway) politicians
Mayors of places in Buskerud
Chairmen of County Councils of Norway
Deputy members of the Storting
People from Sør-Varanger